The Timezgadiouine Formation, sometimes spelled as the Timesgadiouine Formation, is a Triassic geological formation in the Argana Basin of Morocco. It is a succession of red bed sediments spanning from the Olenekian to at least the Carnian, encompassing members T3 to T5 of the Argana Group. It is preceded by the Permian Ikakern Formation and succeeded by the Late Triassic Bigoudine Formation.

The formation is split into three members. The Early Triassic Tanamert Member (T3) is a relatively thin band of volcaniclastic conglomerate, likely emplaced by braided rivers. The Middle Triassic Aglegal Member (T4) is a thick sequence of muddy and silty cyclical deposits interspersed with wide sandstone lenses. It would have been deposited within a semi-arid playa, mudflat, and ephemeral lake system cut by meandering streams or sheet floods. The late Carnian (or possibly early Norian) Irohalene Member (T5) comprises bioturbated mudstone complemented by an increasing abundance of sandstone beds. This final member is likely equivalent to a more humid period with large permanent lakes or wide meandering rivers. The formation as a whole was deposited in a wide and tectonically stable basin, in contrast to the narrow rift basins which developed elsewhere along the present-day Central Atlantic margin during the Triassic.

The Timezgadiouine Formation is quite fossiliferous; footprints and other trace fossils are found through the entire strata, while skeletal material is common in the Irohalene Member. The fossil content of the Irohalene Member includes phytosaurs, aetosaurs, metoposauroid amphibians, stahleckeriid dicynodonts, early dinosauromorphs, and other typical Carnian to early Norian animals. Several animals are distinctive, such as the large herbivorous archosauromorph Azendohsaurus laaroussii, and massive three-toed footprints (Eubrontes sp.) emplaced by a Tyrannosaurus-sized archosaur.

General geology 
The Timezgadiouine Formation is part of the Argana Group, a long succession of red bed sediments deposited in the Argana Basin. The Argana Basin is a northeast-to-southwest oriented valley extending for about 85 km (53 miles) in the western part of the High Atlas. The Argana Group, sometimes known as the Argana Formation, includes most of the geological layers within the basin, separated into eight members, often labelled T1 to T8. Argana Group sediments generally have a shallow dip towards the west or northwest, though faulting can strongly alter this dip in some areas.

The Timezgadiouine Formation corresponds to members T3 (the Tanamert Member) T4 (the Aglegal Member) and T5 (the Irohalene member) of the Argana Group. The base of the Timezgadiouine Formation is separated from the underlying Permian-age Ikakern Formation (members T1-T2) via an angular unconformity. This unconformity may be a result of tectonic instability and erosion related to crustal thinning or post-orogenic collapse of the Variscan mountains. The end of the Timezgadiouine Formation appears to smoothly transition to the succeeding Late Triassic Bigoudine Formation (members T6-T8).

The Argana Basin is divided by a series of steep faults striking in an east-to-west direction. Early studies suggested that normal faults developed during several phases of north–south rifting in the Late Triassic, splitting up the basin into a series of uneven fault blocks. This was partially driven by the assumption that the entire Timezgadiouine Formation was Late Triassic in age, equivalent to rift basins in eastern North America and elsewhere in Morocco. These neighboring rift basins are typically characterized as half-grabens, associated with asymmetrical faulting and the breakup of Pangea.

However, later work argued that the Timezgadiouine Formation was deposited in a broad and tectonically stable basin, with subsidence controlled by gradual sediment loading throughout the Triassic, rather than local faulting or rifting in the Late Triassic specifically. The major east–west faults only affect Permian sediments, so they were likely emplaced during the unconformity between the Ikakern and Timezgadiouine formations. The Timezgadiouine Formation is affected by a few northeast–southwest striking faults, but they appear to have been emplaced after deposition. These later faults were likely a result of tectonic activity related to the Central Atlantic Magmatic Province. Both the east–west and northeast–southwest faults have been reactivated by recent mountain building. Once faulting has been accounted for, the depth of the Timezgadiouine Formation can be reconstructed as fairly uniform and symmetrical during its time of deposition.

Sub-units

Tanamert Member (T3) 
The Tanamert (or Tanameurt) Member, T3, is a quite thin section, only about 10 meters (33 feet) thick. This member consists of volcaniclastic conglomerate arranged into shallow, indistinct cross-beds. Rhyolite is the most common clast type, with smaller proportions of quartz, limestone, phyllite, and fine-grained sedimentary rocks. This conglomerate would have been deposited by braided rivers eroding older volcanic and sedimentary rocks from the Variscan orogeny. The only fossils known from the Tanamert Member are tetrapod footprints consistent with an Early Triassic (Olenekian?) age.

Aglegal Member (T4) 
The Tanamert Member is overlain by the much thicker and more widespread Aglegal Member, T4, which consists of 800–1500 meters (2625–4921 feet) of finer sediments. Most of the Aglegal Member by bulk is arranged into cyclical sequences of fine-grained sediments such as siltstone, mudstone, and clay. Each sequence is about two meters (6.6 feet) thick on average. They sometimes begin with a layer of oolitic limestone, laced with ripple marks, micrite pellets and quartz grains. The limestone is followed by thinly laminated and ripple-marked silty shale, consisting of mud pellets, silt, and fine sand. Laminated sediments are eventually broken up by mudcracks, giving way to a thick section of massive and warped paleosols with randomly dispersed calcareous nodules. Paleosols range from illite-rich claystone with wedge-shaped deformational structures, to mudcracked mudstone with a granular fabric.

Fine-grained sequences likely represent cycles of climate fluctuations. Periods of increasing humidity emplaced shallow, semi-ephemeral lakes (represented by limestone), later replaced with somewhat deeper bodies of water (represented by silty shale). Subsequent drying exposed and fractured the lakebeds, and the area transitioned into a system of semi-arid mudflats and playas which were occasionally supplied with water carrying fine sediments. As the clay and mud was frequently soaked and dried, it would have been processed and deformed into vertisols. Brackish water, seeping through the soil, deposited analcime and calcite, minerals which helped to preserve granular structures in mudstone. The mudcracked mudstone at the top of a sequence corresponds to a final drop in the water table, ending a period of sediment processing until humidity increases once more. It is assumed that the cycles are linked to axial precession during a tectonically stable time frame.

These fine cyclical sequences are randomly interrupted by tabular lenses of coarse sandstone, which can be continuous for up to 15 kilometers (9.3 miles). The sandstone can be identified as a lithic arenite, with a high amount of feldspar, mud pellets, and reprocessed rock alongside quartz grains. Trough cross-bedding and ripple laminations are common, as are burrows. The sandstone lenses may correspond to lag deposits from sheet floods or meandering streams. Both body fossils and ichnofossils occur, though they are rare. Ichnofossils include tetrapod tracks typical of the Middle Triassic, while body fossils include rare fragments of fish and capitosaurian amphibians. Ostracods and charophytes support a Middle Triassic age.

Irohalene Member (T5) 
The youngest and most fossiliferous member of the Timezgadiouine Formation is the 200-500 meter (656–1640 feet) thick Irohalene Member, T5. The lower part of this member is mainly silty mudstone arranged into even, continuous layers. Bioturbation is prominent, lending the mudstone a homogenous character without sedimentary structures or graded bedding. Further up in the member, sandstone beds become prevalent, starting with fine, calcite-rich sandstone with common ripple marks. These transition to coarser, evenly-bedded quartz sandstone with broader cross bedding. The relative thickness of mudstone-dominated and sandstone-dominated layers is strongly variable within the basin. The Irohalene Member likely corresponds to a lacustrine environment, dotted with brackish permanent lakes. The deepest lakes developed the thickest mud deposits, while shallower lakes or areas closer to shorelines developed sandbars. Alternating muddy and sandy intervals may also correspond to a floodplain and meandering river system.

Fossils are common near the base and top of the Irohalene Member. These include a diverse assortment of trace fossils and body fossils from both terrestrial and aquatic animals. The age of the Irohalene Member is universally considered to be within the Late Triassic.  It has been labelled as “Otischalkian” (Late Carnian?) under the Land Vertebrate Faunachron system of Triassic tetrapod biostratigraphy. This was justified by the supposed presence of proposed Otischalkian index fossils such as Paleorhinus, Angistorhinus, Longosuchus, Placerias, and Metoposaurus. Ichnofossils and general sedimentological comparisons to other formations support this general age assessment. However, the presence of clear Otischalkian index fossils in the Irohalene Member is debatable, as multiple Irohalene tetrapod species have been reclassified into endemic genera. Moreover, several proposed Otischalkian index fossils are paraphyletic or have a long temporal range extending into the early Norian. As a result, the Irohalene Member may be as young as the early Norian.

Paleobiota

Reptiles

Synapsids

Temnospondyls

Fish

Trace fossils
Apart from the following named ichnotaxa, complex tetrapod burrow systems have been described from the Aglegal Member. These burrows were likely created by small and gregarious procolophonids or therapsids, which also may have been the trackmakers responsible for Procolophonichnium tracks.

References 

Carnian Stage
Geologic formations of Morocco
Mesozoic Morocco